Hubballi–Gangavathi Express is an Express train belonging to South Western Railway zone of Indian Railways that run between  and Gangavathi of Karnataka state in India.

Background
This train was inaugurated on 3 June 2019 at Gangavathi railway station, flagged off by Karadi Sanganna Amarappa a BJP MP from Koppal (Lok Sabha constituency) and Paranna Munavalli a BJP MLA from Gangavathi for connectivity between the major commercial hub of North Karnataka-Hubli & rice bowl of Karnataka-Gangavathi of Karnataka State.

Service
The frequency of this train is daily, it covers the distance of 165 km with an average speed of 42 km/hr.

Routes
This train passes through  &  in both directions.

Traction
As this route is currently going to be electrified, a WDP-4 based loco pulls the train to its destination on both sides.

External links
 17303 Hubballi–Gangavathi Express
 17304 Gangavathi–Hubballi Express

References

Express trains in India
Rail transport in Karnataka
Transport in Hubli-Dharwad